Karen Lynn Gorney (born ) is an American actress who had roles in television shows and films including the soap opera All My Children and the movie Saturday Night Fever.

Early life
Gorney's father is Jay Gorney, who was born in Białystok, Poland, and was a composer who wrote the music for the song about America's Great Depression, "Brother, Can You Spare a Dime?" Her family is Jewish. She earned a Bachelor of Fine Arts degree from Carnegie Mellon University and a Master of Fine Arts from Brandeis University. Karen is the sister of Daniel Gorney, and half-sister of author, professor, and physician Roderic Gorney, who has taught for many years at UCLA.

Career

Early work
Gorney made her film debut as a teenage resident of a mental health treatment center in David and Lisa (1962). Her next work on the big screen came in 1970 with the film The Magic Garden of Stanley Sweetheart. From 1970 to 1974, Gorney played the role of Tara Martin on the soap opera All My Children. After she left the show, Gorney had agreed to return when her replacement, actress/writer Stephanie Braxton, decided to leave the show. She returned for the 1976–1977 season but was eventually fired as Tara and did not return to the show until almost 20 years later.

In 1977, Gorney co-starred in her third film, and biggest role to date, as Stephanie Mangano in Saturday Night Fever, alongside John Travolta. The next year, she appeared as a celebrity panelist on Hollywood Squares.

Return to film, stage, and TV
After a lengthy gap, during which she managed an art gallery in Manhattan, New York, Gorney eventually returned to acting in the early 1990s, appearing in small roles in such films as The Hard Way (1991), Ripe (1996), and Creating Karma (2006), and returning to All My Children during 1995 in cameo spots. More recently, she has guest-starred in a number of TV shows, including Law & Order, The Sopranos, and Six Degrees, as well as doing independent films and off-Broadway shows.

Due to her connection with disco music, and her popular role in Saturday Night Fever, she has been featured on a number of disco documentaries and specials, including Get Down Tonight: The Disco Explosion, which she co-hosted with Saturday Night Fever choreographer Deney Terrio for PBS.  During the show, Gorney and Terrio dance to Bee Gees' hit single "More Than a Woman" as she did with co-star John Travolta in Saturday Night Fever back in 1977.  She appeared on VH1's When Disco Ruled the World and was interviewed for the disco video documentary Disco: Spinning the Story. In 1997, Gorney had an uncredited role as an announcer in the film 'Men in Black.'

She appeared in the UK on ITV1's lunchtime programme Loose Women (a topical debate programme from a woman's perspective) on 28 September 2007, helping to promote the 30th anniversary of the launch of the film Saturday Night Fever and the Bee Gees's new Greatest Hits album.

She was featured in the role of the Judge in the 2008 independent feature film Dear J.

Gorney is a long-time resident of New York City.  In 2008, she appeared in the stage production Monsterface at the Irish Rep Theater. In October 2010, Gorney performed the role of "Belaria" in Frog and Peach Theatre Company's production of Cymbeline at the West End Theatre, in Manhattan, New York.

Music
Along with her acting work, Gorney is a singer and has released three albums: Used to Love You Madly, Hot Moonlight!, and The Dance of the Deadly's. She has performed at various jazz clubs and cafes.

Filmography

Films

Television

Discography

References

External links
 
 
 Official site for Karen Lynn Gorney

20th-century American actresses
21st-century American actresses
Actresses from Beverly Hills, California
American film actresses
American soap opera actresses
American stage actresses
American television actresses
American voice actresses
Brandeis University alumni
Carnegie Mellon University College of Fine Arts alumni
Living people
Jewish American actresses
Year of birth missing (living people)